The Steel Curtain was the defensive line of the 1970s American football team Pittsburgh Steelers of the National Football League (NFL). The line was the backbone of the Steelers dynasty, which won four Super Bowls (IX, X, XIII, and XIV) in six years.

The Steelers began their 1976 season 1–4 and lost their quarterback, Terry Bradshaw. For the nine games remaining in the season, the Steelers recorded five shutouts (three of them uninterrupted), and only allowed two touchdowns (both in a single game), and five field goals. The defense allowed an average 3.1 points per game and the team had an average margin of victory of 22 points. Eight of the Steelers' starting eleven defensive players were selected for the Pro Bowl that year, and four would be selected to the Hall of Fame.

Lineup 
The Steel Curtain included:
 No. 75 "Mean" Joe Greene – defensive tackle 1969–1981, 4-time Super Bowl champion (IX, X, XIII, XIV), 10-time Pro Bowl selection (1969–1976, 1978, 1979), 2-time NFL Defensive Player of the Year (1972, 1974), NFL 1970s All-Decade Team, Pro Football Hall of Fame, Pittsburgh Steelers All-Time Team, NFL 100 All-Time Team
 No. 68 L. C. Greenwood – defensive end 1969–1981, 4-time Super Bowl champion (IX, X, XIII, XIV), 6-time Pro Bowl (1973–1976, 1978, 1979), NFL 1970s All-Decade Team, Pittsburgh Steelers All-Time Team
 No. 63 Ernie Holmes – defensive tackle 1972–1977, 2-time Super Bowl champion (IX, X)
 No. 78 Dwight White – defensive end 1971–1980, 4-time Super Bowl champion (IX, X, XIII, XIV), 2-time Pro Bowl (1972, 1973), Pittsburgh Steelers All-Time Team

Greene is the only surviving member of the line, with the deaths of Holmes and White in 2008 and Greenwood in 2013.

Origin of the Legacy name 

The nickname "Steel Curtain", a play on the phrase "Iron Curtain" popularized by former British Prime Minister Winston Churchill, originated in a 1971 contest sponsored by Pittsburgh radio station WTAE to name the defense. The name was also a play on Pittsburgh's reputation for steel production. The contest was won by Gregory Kronz, a ninth grader at a suburban high school. According to the Pittsburgh Post-Gazette, "he was just one of 17 people who submitted the 'Steel Curtain' moniker to the WTAE contest, necessitating a drawing for the grand prize," which Kronz won.

Namesakes
The Steel Curtain roller coaster at Kennywood, which opened in 2019, was named after the Steelers' defensive line.

References

Pittsburgh Steelers
Nicknamed groups of American football players
 *